Super shell or Supershell may refer to:

 Super Shell FC, a Somalian football club
 Supershell, a very large void in the interstellar medium
 A weapon used in the arcade game 1943: The Battle of Midway

See also
 Superswell